In Greek mythology, Caeneus was a Lapith hero of Thessaly.

Family 
According to Book XII of Ovid's Metamorphoses, he was originally a woman, Caenis, daughter of Atrax.

In Apollonius of Rhodes' Argonautica, he is briefly noted as the great father of a lesser son, Coronus, who sailed forth among the Argonauts. Caeneus was also an Argonaut in some versions. The striking mythic image of this hero is that, indomitable through his more-than-human power, his enemies the Centaurs resorted to driving him into the ground with timbers:

Myth 

Caeneus was originally a woman named Caenis who was transformed into a man by the sea-god Poseidon. According to the Greek mythographer Apollodorus, and a scholiast on the Iliad, Poseidon had sex with her, and afterward she asked him to turn her into an invincible man; Poseidon granted her wish. According to Acusilaus, whose version is the earliest surviving one, Caenis (here spelled Καινή, Caene), after having sex with him, asked Poseidon to turn her into a man so that she would not bear his child, or anyone else's. In another version, Poseidon wished to sleep with her, but Caenis made him promise her a favour in exchange for hers; he did, and she asked to be transformed into a man, whereupon he granted her wish, but due to her change he failed to fulfill his own.

According to Ovid however, Caenis was abducted and raped by Poseidon. After raping Caenis, Poseidon was pleased and promised to grant Caenis a wish. Caenis was so distraught that she demanded to be changed into a man, so that she might never be wronged again. Poseidon granted this wish, and also gave Caenis impenetrable skin. Thereafter, the spelling of Caenis was changed to Caeneus to mark his transformation.

Caeneus is said to have died in the battle between the Lapiths and the centaurs (see Pirithous). Similarly, in the Iliad (without referring to these transformations) Nestor numbers Caeneus among an earlier generation of heroes of his youth, "the strongest men that Earth has bred, the strongest men against the strongest enemies, a savage mountain-dwelling tribe whom they utterly destroyed".

In Ovid's description of the tale, a particular centaur, Latreus, mocks Caeneus and denies his skill as a fighter when he realizes that Caeneus is originally female. Caeneus strikes Latreus a blow in the side, and is unharmed by the centaur's last attempts at wounding him. In revenge for this, the centaurs piled pine-tree trunks (some say fir trees) and stones upon him, since he was immune to weapons.

There are several descriptions of Caeneus' fate after he had been crushed down by the trunks. One vase, for instance, depicts him as sinking down into the earth, upright, and buried at the waist; this legend is described in Ovid's Metamorphoses as well, and implies that Caeneus is falling directly into Tartarus. Ovid states that Caeneus flew away from the pile of tree trunks as a golden-winged bird. This version of the ending is witnessed by Mopsus as well as Nestor, who tells the story.

Caeneus' legend is found in Metamorphoses, where he is mentioned briefly as a participant in the hunt for the Calydonian Boar. Some time after this appearance, Nestor tells the story of Caeneus to Achilles in fuller detail, describing his transformation from female to male. In Ovid's retelling, placed in the mouth of the aged Homeric hero Nestor, Caenis, the daughter of Elatus (a Lapith chieftain) and Hippea, was raped by Poseidon, who then fulfilled her request to be changed into a man so that she could never be raped again; he also made Caenis invulnerable to weaponry.  Caenis then changed his name to Caeneus and became a warrior, traveling all over Thessaly, and later taking part in the hunt for the Calydonian Boar.

In the Argonautica of Apollonius Rhodius, Caeneus is said to be the father of Coronus, one of the Argonauts.

Virgil also says that Aeneas sees him, having been returned to his original female form by the Fates, in the Fields of Mourning as he visits the underworld in Book Six of the Aeneid. He was also mentioned in the Hesiodic Catalogue of Women.

In some accounts, Caeneus killed himself.

See also 
 Iphis 
 Leucippus, two other women transformed by the gods into men

Notes

References 
 
 Françoise LECOCQ (2013). « Caeneus auis unica (Ovide, Mét. 12, 532) est-il le phénix ? ». Le phénix et son Autre. Poétique d'un mythe, dir. L. Gosserez, Presses Universitaires de Rennes, collection Interférences, p. 211-220.
 Homer, The Iliad with an English Translation by A.T. Murray, PhD in two volumes. Cambridge, MA., Harvard University Press; London, William Heinemann, Ltd. 1924. Online version at the Perseus Digital Library.
 Apollonius Rhodius, Argonautica translated by Robert Cooper Seaton (1853–1915), R. C. Loeb Classical Library Volume 001. London, William Heinemann Ltd, 1912. Online version at the Topos Text Project.
 Vergil, Aeneid. Theodore C. Williams. trans. Boston. Houghton Mifflin Co. 1910. Online version at the Perseus Digital Library.
 Ovid. Metamorphoses, Volume I: Books 1-8. Translated by Frank Justus Miller. Revised by G. P. Goold. Loeb Classical Library No. 42. Cambridge, Massachusetts: Harvard University Press, 1977, first published 1916. . Online version at Harvard University Press.
 Ovid, Metamorphoses. Translated by A. D. Melville; introduction and notes by E. J. Kenney. Oxford: Oxford University Press. 2008. .
 Apollodorus, Apollodorus, The Library, with an English Translation by Sir James George Frazer, F.B.A., F.R.S. in 2 Volumes. Cambridge, MA, Harvard University Press; London, William Heinemann Ltd. 1921. Online version at the Perseus Digital Library.
 Antoninus Liberalis, The Metamorphoses of Antoninus Liberalis translated by Francis Celoria (Routledge 1992). Online version at the Topos Text Project.
 Hyginus, Gaius Julius, The Myths of Hyginus. Edited and translated by Mary A. Grant, Lawrence: University of Kansas Press, 1960.

External links 

 Encyclopædia Britannica, s.v. "Caeneus"
 Images of Caenis/Caeneus in the Warburg Institute Iconographic Database

Characters in Book VI of the Aeneid
Metamorphoses into the opposite sex in Greek mythology
Women in Greek mythology
Metamorphoses characters
Mythological rape victims
Lapiths in Greek mythology
Deeds of Zeus
Suicides in Greek mythology
Metamorphoses into birds in Greek mythology